KHRK (97.7 FM) is a radio station licensed to serve the community of Hennessey, Oklahoma. The station is owned by Chisholm Trail Broadcasting Co. It airs a classic rock format.

The station was assigned the call sign KHEO by the Federal Communications Commission on August 17, 2018. The station changed its call sign to KHRK on October 19, 2018. KHRK programming is also heard on co-owned KNAH 99.7-HD-3 digital channel.

References

External links
Official Website

HRK (FM)
Radio stations established in 2018
2018 establishments in Oklahoma
Classic rock radio stations in the United States
Kingfisher County, Oklahoma